In Colour is the second album by the Swedish  band The Concretes. The album was released 13 March 2006 in the UK and 4 April 2006 in the US.

Track listing
All tracks written by Victoria Bergsman and The Concretes, except where noted.
"On the Radio" – 3:23
"Sunbeams" (Bergsman, The Concretes, Maria Eriksson, Lisa Milberg) – 3:24
"Change in the Weather" – 2:53
"Chosen One" – 3:09
"Your Call" (The Concretes, Milberg) – 3:29
"Fiction" (Bergsman, The Concretes, Milberg) – 6:01
"Tomorrow" (Bergsman) – 3:44
"As Four" (Bergsman) – 2:32
"Grey Days" (The Concretes, Milberg) – 4:42
"A Way of Life" – 5:01
"Ooh La La" (Bergsman, The Concretes, Milberg) – 2:59
"Song for the Songs" (The Concretes, Milberg) – 3:49

Release details

References

External links
Official album website
Official artist website

2006 albums
The Concretes albums
Astralwerks albums
EMI Records albums
Licking Fingers albums
Albums produced by Mike Mogis